Shawna Langill Waldron (born January 25, 1982) is an American actress. Waldron is best known for her roles as Becky O'Shea in the 1994 sports comedy film Little Giants and as Bonnie Stiles on CBS television series Ladies Man.

Career
Waldron was featured in a string of commercial roles before landing the part of Becky "Icebox" O'Shea, the only girl on a pee-wee football team, in the movie Little Giants. Little Giants is considered her feature film debut (the film The New Kid, in which she also acted, has never been released). After starring in Little Giants, Waldron went on to play Michael Douglas' daughter in the movie The American President.

Waldron's first television role was in the pilot for CBS's Morning Glory. She then guest-starred on the series Malony in which she played the dramatic role of a teen who had witnessed a murder.

Waldron was nominated for Best Performance in a TV comedy series, Supporting Young Actress category from the Twenty-first Annual Young Artist Awards for 1998–1999 for her role in Ladies Man.

Filmography

Film

Television

Producer

Awards and nominations

References

External links

1982 births
20th-century American actresses
21st-century American actresses
Actresses from Los Angeles
American child actresses
American film actresses
American television actresses
Living people